was a  after Ten-ei and before Gen'ei. This period spanned the years from July 1113 through April 1118.

Change of Era
 January 20, 1113 : The new era name was created to mark an event or series of events. The previous era ended and the new one commenced in Ten'ei 4, on the thirteenth day of the seventh month of 1113.

Events of the Eikyū Era
 1113 (Eikyū 1, 4th month): Fujiwara Tadasane was named kampaku.
 1113 (Eikyū 1, 4th month): Emperor Toba visited the  Matsunoo Shrine and the Kitano Tenman-gū. When the emperor visits  Shinto shrines,  it is always a pleasure party for him. Without this pretext, court etiquette did not permit him to leave the palace.
 1113 (Eikyū 1, 10th month): Toba visited the temples on Mount Hiei in the vicinity of Kyoto.
 1113 (Eikyū 1, 11th month ): Toba visited the Inari Shrine and the Gion Shrine.

Notes

References
 Brown, Delmer M. and Ichirō Ishida, eds. (1979).  Gukanshō: The Future and the Past. Berkeley: University of California Press. ;  OCLC 251325323
 Nussbaum, Louis-Frédéric and Käthe Roth. (2005).  Japan encyclopedia. Cambridge: Harvard University Press. ;  OCLC 58053128
 Titsingh, Isaac. (1834). Nihon Odai Ichiran; ou,  Annales des empereurs du Japon.  Paris: Royal Asiatic Society, Oriental Translation Fund of Great Britain and Ireland. OCLC 5850691
 Varley, H. Paul. (1980). A Chronicle of Gods and Sovereigns: Jinnō Shōtōki of Kitabatake Chikafusa. New York: Columbia University Press. ;  OCLC 6042764

External links
 National Diet Library, "The Japanese Calendar" -- historical overview plus illustrative images from library's collection

Japanese eras
1110s in Japan